The Nordkirchen transmitter is a medium-wave broadcasting facility of Deutsche Telekom near Nordkirchen in Northrhine-Westphalia.  It was built in 1979 and 1980 after the 549 kHz frequency was again made available in that location.

It transmitted at a power of 100 kW and uses a directional antenna, aimed at the Northeast, consisting of two ground-fed, guyed, lattice steel masts 136 metres apart. The power opposite the antenna's focal point was approximately one-third the total radiated power. This avoided conflicting with the nearby Wavre transmitter in Belgium, which works on the neighbouring 540 kHz frequency. OFF AIR in 2007

In 2004, a second medium-wave transmitter with a power of 5 kW for transmitting the privately owned radio programme Truckradio was installed at Nordkirchen transmitter, which uses the same antenna as the transmitter of Deutschlandfunk.

References

External links
 https://web.archive.org/web/20070202095847/http://www.asamnet.de/~bienerhj/0549-NW.html
 
 Entry of Mast 1 at Skyscraperpage
 Entry of Mast 2 at Skyscraperpage
https://web.archive.org/web/20081011141506/http://www.waniewski.de/id540.htm
 Nordkirchen transmitter on Google Maps

Radio masts and towers in Germany
Towers completed in 1980
1980 establishments in West Germany